James H. Rupp. Jr. (May 17, 1918 – September 30, 1998) was an American politician, businessman, and Republican member of the Illinois Senate from 1977 to 1987.

Biographical sketch
Rupp was born in Kearny, New Jersey and graduated from Kearny High School in 1936. He did post-graduate work at Staunton Military Academy in 1937. Rupp received a bachelor's degree in business and economics from Monmouth College in Monmouth, Illinois. He served in the United States Navy during World War II and was commissioned a lieutenant commander. Rupp lived in Decatur, Illinois with his wife and family and was worked in the insurance business. Rupp served as mayor of Decatur, Illinois from 1966 to 1976.

Rupp was elected to the Illinois Senate in the 1976 general election, defeating Democratic incumbent Robert McCarthy, also of Decatur. He served in the Senate 1977 to 1987. In 1986, Rupp was challenged for reelection to the Illinois Senate by Penny Severns. Though Rupp was the earlier favorite, a combination of a media savvy candidate, a well-planned campaign strategy, keeping the focus on chosen issues and targeting of rural areas that Rupp allegedly neglected were credited with the success of her campaign. It was one of the few upset races for the Illinois General Assembly that election cycle.

Rupp died in Decatur, Illinois on September 30, 1998.

Notes

1918 births
1998 deaths
People from Kearny, New Jersey
Military personnel from New Jersey
Monmouth College alumni
Kearny High School (New Jersey) alumni
Staunton Military Academy alumni
Businesspeople from Illinois
Mayors of Decatur, Illinois
Republican Party Illinois state senators
20th-century American politicians
20th-century American businesspeople